The 1979 Mediterranean Games football tournament was the 8th edition of the Mediterranean Games men's football tournament. The football tournament was held in Split, Yugoslavia between 21 and 29 September 1979 as part of the 1979 Mediterranean Games and was contested by 8 teams.

Participating teams
Eight teams took part in the tournament.

Squads

Venues

Tournament
All times local : Time zone (UTC+1)

Group stage

Group A

Group B

Knockout stage

Semi-finals

Third place match

Final

Tournament classification

References

External links
Football at 1979 Mediterranean Games at Rec.Sport.Soccer Statistics Foundation

1979
Sports at the 1979 Mediterranean Games
1979–80 in French football
1979–80 in Yugoslav football
1979–80 in Turkish football
1979–80 in Greek football
1979 in African football
1979 in Asian football
1979
1979–80 in Algerian football